Ficus tsjahela is a fig tree from the family Moraceae which is found in peninsular India and Sri Lanka. It is commonly known as the kaaral in Malayalam, kal-aal in Tamil and boviyamara in Kannada.

State wise distribution 
Ficus tsjahela occurs in coastal regions of Maharashtra and Karnataka, all districts of Kerala and in many districts of Tamil Nadu. In Maharashtra, the tree is found in Ahmednagar, Ratnagiri, Satara and Sindhudurg districts. In Karnataka, F. tsjahela occurs in Chikmagalur, Hassan, Mysore, Shimoga, North and South Kanara districts. 
In Tamil Nadu, the tree ranges in Coimbatore, Dharmapuri, Kanyakumari, Nilgiri, Salem, Tirunelveli, Tiruvannamalai, Vellore and Viluppuram. In Kerala, the tree is reported from Neeliyar Kottam, a sacred grove in Kannur District.

Field description

Habit 
Deciduous trees up to 25 m tall.

Trunk and bark 
Bark dark brown; blaze red.

Branches and branchlets 
Branchlets terete, glabrous.
Exudates

Latex white, profuse.

Leaves 
Leaves simple, alternate, spiral; stipules foliaceous, 0.7 cm long, caducous and leaving annular scar; petiole ca. 6 cm long, canaliculate, glabrous; lamina to 20 x 8 cm, oblong, elliptic-oblong, apex acuminate, base rounded, coriaceous, margin entire, glabrous and glossy; basally 3-nerved; midrib raised above; secondary nerves 6-10 pairs, prominent and parallel, looped near the margin; tertiary nerves reticulate.

Inflorescence / flower 
Inflorescence syconia, sessile, depressed-globose, in clusters of 2-6, on very short crowded tubercles in the axils of the leaves or most frequently at the scars of fallen leaves; flowers unisexual.

Fruit and seeds 
Syconium, sessile, ca. 0.5 cm across, greenish; achenes smooth.

References 

 Ficus tsjahela Burm. f., Fl. Ind. 227. 1768; Hook. f., Fl. Brit. India 5: 514. 1888, "tjakela"; Gamble, Fl. Pres. Madras 1362(953). 1928; Manilal & Sivar., Fl. Calicut 277. 1982; Mohanan, Fl. Quilon Dist. 380. 1984; Ansari, Fl. Kasaragod Div. 358. 1985; Manilal, Fl. Silent Valley 260. 1988; Ramach. & V.J. Nair, Fl. Cannanore Dist. 434. 1988; Babu, Fl. Malappuram Dist. 756. 1990; Vajr., Fl. Palghat Dist. 450. 1990; M. Mohanan & Henry, Fl. Thiruvananthapuram 434. 1994; Subram., Fl. Thenmala Div. 353. 1995; Sasidh. et al., Bot. Stud. Med. Pl. Kerala 18,31. 1996; Sasidh. & Sivar., Fl. Pl. Thrissur For. 430. 1996; Sasidh., Fl. Shenduruny WLS 305. 1997; Sivar. & Mathew, Fl. Nilambur 671. 1997; Sasidh., Fl. Periyar Tiger Reserve 395. 1998; Sasidh., Fl. Chinnar WLS 299. 1999; Sasidh., Fl. Parambikulam WLS 314. 2002; Mohanan & Sivad., Fl. Agasthyamala 637. 2002; Anil Kumar et al., Fl. Pathanamthitta 466. 2005; Sunil & Sivadasan, Fl. Alappuzha Dist. 666. 2009; Ratheesh Narayanan, Fl. Stud. Wayanad Dist. 775. 2009.
 Flora of Tamil Nadu, VOL. II, 1987; Matthew 1983

tsjahela
Flora of India (region)
Taxa named by Nicolaas Laurens Burman